In set theory, a set is called hereditarily countable if it is a countable set of hereditarily countable sets. This inductive definition is well-founded and can be expressed in the language of first-order set theory. A set is hereditarily countable if and only if it is countable, and every element of its transitive closure is countable. If the axiom of countable choice holds, then a set is hereditarily countable if and only if its transitive closure is countable. 

The class of all hereditarily countable sets can be proven to be a set from the axioms of Zermelo–Fraenkel set theory (ZF) without any form of the axiom of choice, and this set is designated . The hereditarily countable sets form a model of Kripke–Platek set theory with the axiom of infinity (KPI), if the axiom of countable choice is assumed in the metatheory.

If , then .

More generally, a set is hereditarily of cardinality less than κ if it is of cardinality less than κ, and all its elements  are hereditarily of cardinality less than κ; the class of all such sets can also be proven to be a set from the axioms of ZF, and is designated . If the axiom of choice holds and the cardinal κ is regular, then a set is hereditarily of cardinality less than κ if and only if its transitive closure is of cardinality less than κ.

See also
Hereditarily finite set
Constructible universe

External links
"On Hereditarily Countable Sets" by Thomas Jech

Set theory
Large cardinals